David Chote is a former association football player who represented New Zealand at international level.

Chote made his full All Whites debut in a 4–2 win over Fiji on 17 September 1986 and ended his international playing career with four A-international caps to his credit, his final cap an appearance in a 0–1 loss to Fiji on 19 November 1988.

References

External links
 

Year of birth missing (living people)
Living people
New Zealand association footballers
New Zealand international footballers
Association football forwards
Miramar Rangers AFC players